Głodowo may refer to the following places:
Głodowo, Lipno County in Kuyavian-Pomeranian Voivodeship (north-central Poland)
Głodowo, Świecie County in Kuyavian-Pomeranian Voivodeship (north-central Poland)
Głodowo, Masovian Voivodeship (east-central Poland)
Głodowo, Greater Poland Voivodeship (west-central Poland)
Głodowo, Gmina Miastko in Pomeranian Voivodeship (north Poland)
Głodowo, Kościerzyna County in Pomeranian Voivodeship (north Poland)
Głodowo, Słupsk County in Pomeranian Voivodeship (north Poland)
Głodowo, Mrągowo County in Warmian-Masurian Voivodeship (north Poland)
Głodowo, Pisz County in Warmian-Masurian Voivodeship (north Poland)